Psednometopum is a genus of tephritid  or fruit flies in the family Tephritidae.

Species
Psednometopum aldabrense (Lamb, 1914)
Psednometopum nigritum Munro, 1937

References

Tephritinae
Tephritidae genera
Diptera of Africa